Pipa is a town in Wudu District, Longnan, Gansu province, China. , it has 26 villages under its administration: 
Wutuo Village
Maya Village
Loudi Village
Maopo Village
Jigongyan Village
Qiuju Village
Wangjiashanggou Village
Tangba Village
Wafangba Village
Mafugou Village
Hujiagou Village
Xiaochuanba Village
Majiagou Village
Gaojiaba Village
Pipajie Village
Xiaohe Village
Wujiashan Village
Longtan Village
Xiagaojia Village
Wangjiashan Village
Maojiagou Village
Zhangba Village
Xuanwan Village
Ningqiang Village
Tanba Village
Shuimo Village

See also 
 List of township-level divisions of Gansu

References 

Township-level divisions of Gansu
Longnan